This was the first edition of the tournament.

Brydan Klein and Dane Propoggia defeated Alex Bolt and Nick Kyrgios 6–4, 4–6, [11–9] in the final to win the title.

Seeds

Draw

Draw

References 
 Main Draw

Men's Doubles
2013 Men's Doubles
Nature's Way